Salem Abdullah may refer to:

Salem Abdullah (footballer, born 1986) Emirati footballer
Salem Abdullah (footballer, born 1984) Emirati footballer
Salem Abdullah (footballer, born 1998) Emirati footballer